*astTECS is an Indian telecom company, which provides enterprise telecom products and Asterisk-based open source communication services, headquartered in Bangalore, India. The company is ISO 9001:2008 and ISO 9001:2015 certified. In 2013, *astTECS was featured in the Red Herring Global Top 100 Winners List and Asia Top 100 Winners.

History and overview 
The company was founded in 2010 and developed its first open source IP PBX system.  The company specializes in open source Asterisk-based VoIP services and products.

In 2012, *astTECS launched an NTP 2012 Policy compliant IP PBX series with video conferencing facility. In October 2012, the company expanded its operation in South Africa and the Middle East through partners. In September, 2014 *astTECS also appointed a partner in Fiji and started its operation in many parts of India like New Delhi, Pune, Indore, Cochin, Mumbai and Coimbatore. It launched *astTECS IP PBX for the hospitality industry in June 2014 and  *astTECS IP PBX for educational institutions in June 2016. As of August 2016, it also has offices in Ghana and Botswana.

In June, 2017, *astTECS announced the launch of *astPG 30 and *astPG 60 PRI Gateway. In July 2017, It launched an IP PBX for small and medium-sized businesses. The company started providing cloud-based voice logging services since November 2017. In May 2018, *astTECS launched *astTRAC, a location tracking CRM system, and *astDial, mobile cloud telephony for contact centers.

Product and services 

 IP PBX
 Call Center Dialer
 Voice logger
 Interactive voice response
 Video conference
 Gateways
 Interface cards
 IP Phones
 CRM
 SBC
 Open Source Technology: Asterisk, Elastix, A2Billing, VICIdial
 Training on Asterisk: *astTECS Academy

Exhibitions 
Some of its products has been demonstrated and exhibited in India Electronics Week, Open Source India, CommunicAsia, GITEX Convergence India, CeBIT and GES.

Accreditations  
It is independently accredited and assesses a wide range of standards and other specifications including:
 ISO 9001:2008 
 ISO 9001:2015

Awards and recognition
 Red Herring's Top 100 Global Award, 2013.
 Red Herring's Asia Top 100 Winners, 2013.
 Listed amongst the Top 20 Most promising Open Source Solutions Service Providers, 2015.
 Brand of the Year 2016 by Silicon India Magazine.
 Listed among the Top 20 Most Promising Call Center Technology Solution Providers, 2016 by CIO Review.
 Listed amongst the Top 10 Made in India Brands 2017 by SME Channel Magazine.

See also 

 List of telecom companies in India
 Telecommunications in India

References

External links 
 Official website
 Interview With *astTecs CEO Devasia Kurian  (Teleanalysi)

Telecommunications companies of India
Indian companies established in 2010
Telecommunications companies established in 2010
Companies based in Bangalore
2010 establishments in Karnataka